Jean Vauthier (20 September 1910 – 5 May 1992) was a 20th-century French playwright.

Plays 
 1952: La Nouvelle Mandragore after Machiavelli, directed by Gérard Philipe, TNP Théâtre national de Chaillot
 1955: Le Personnage combattant
 1957: Les Prodiges
 1960: Le Rêveur
 1962: Badadesques
 1970: Le Sang

Distinctions

Prizes 
 1980: Prix Théâtre SACD de la Société des auteurs et compositeurs dramatiques
 1981: Prix Delmas of the Académie Française
 1981: Prix de la Ville de Paris (littérature dramatique)
 1984 : Grand Prix du Théâtre de l’Académie Française 
 1987: Prix Georges-Lerminier du Syndicat de la critique
 1990: Grand prix SACD of the Société des auteurs et compositeurs dramatiques

Honours 
 1981: Chevalier des Arts et Lettres
 1982: Chevalier of the Légion d'honneur
 1990: Commandeur des Arts et Lettres
 1990: Médaille de la Ville de Bordeaux
 1991: Officier de la Légion d'honneur

External links 
 
 Detailed biography on repertoire.chartreuse.org
 List of his works on Les Archives du spectacle
 Biographie Page of the ministère de la Culture français
 Biography on Encyclopædia Universalis

People from Liège Province
1910 births
1992 deaths
20th-century French dramatists and playwrights
Commandeurs of the Ordre des Arts et des Lettres
Officiers of the Légion d'honneur